The 2004 Speedway Grand Prix was the 59th edition of the official World Championship and the tenth season in the Speedway Grand Prix era used to determine the Speedway World Champion.

After finishing second in 2001, 2002 and 2003, Jason Crump broke through to become Australia's first Individual World Champion since Jack Young had won his second straight World title in 1952.

Event format

The system first used in 1998 continued to be adopted with 24 riders, divided into two classes. The eight best would be directly qualified for the "Main Event", while the sixteen others would be knocked out if they finished out of the top two in 4-man heats on two occasions – while they would go through if they finished inside the top two on two occasions. This resulted in 10 heats, where eight proceeded to the Main Event, where exactly the same system was applied to give eight riders to a semi-final.

The semi-finals were then two heats of four, where the top two qualified for a final – there was no consolation final. The 4 finalists scored 25, 20, 18 and 16 points, with 5th and 6th place getting 13, 7th and 8th 11, and after that 8, 8, 7, 7, etc. Places after 8th place were awarded according to the time a rider was knocked out and, secondly, according to position in the last heat he rode in.

Qualification for Grand Prix

The 2004 season had 22 permanent riders and two wild cards at each event.  The permanent riders are highlighted in the results table below.

Event Schedule and Winners 
Calendar

Final standings

References

External links
 List of results from Official Speedway GP site

2004
World I